Faress Tarek (born 14 January 2000) is an Egyptian professional footballer who plays as a right-back for Al Ahly.

Career statistics

Club

Notes

References

2000 births
Living people
Egyptian footballers
Association football defenders
Egyptian Premier League players
Al Ahly SC players
Misr Lel Makkasa SC players